The Owl (Leland Owlsley) is a supervillain appearing in American comic books published by Marvel Comics. The character is depicted usually as an enemy of the superheroes Daredevil, Spider-Man and Black Cat. Created by writer Stan Lee and artist Joe Orlando, the character first appeared in Daredevil #3 (August 1964).

The character has appeared in numerous media adaptations, including the television series Daredevil, set in the Marvel Cinematic Universe in which he was played by Bob Gunton.

Publication history
The character first appeared in Daredevil #3 (August 1964). He was a recurring foe of Daredevil during the 1960s and 1970s. Since then, he has made occasional appearances in various Marvel titles, against such superheroes as Spider-Man, and has faced Daredevil again.

Originally Bob Layton, writer of the first five issues of X-Factor, had intended to use the Owl as the Alliance of Evil's mysterious master (mentioned in X-Factor #4 (May 1986). The final page of X-Factor #5 initially featured the Owl, but as Layton was removed from the book and replaced with Louise Simonson, the final page was changed to feature a new character named Apocalypse instead, as Simonson and editor Bob Harras wanted a new villain for the book.

Fictional character biography
Leland Owlsley was once a successful financier and financial investor, nicknamed "The Owl of Wall Street" for his financial wisdom, until evidence of his tax evasion and crooked business deals were exposed by the Internal Revenue Service (IRS). Rather than fight the charges, he took up residence in a hideout across the Hudson River and pursued a new career as a crime lord. The Owl had already been pooling a percentage of his earnings into researching superpowered enhancements, and by this time these efforts had yielded a serum which gave him the ability to fly. He subsequently employed two enforcers and captured Daredevil in a chance encounter, planning to kill him at a meeting of underworld bosses in order to make himself the undisputed overlord of crime. However, Daredevil escaped and confronted the Owl in battle. Eventually determining that he could not defeat Daredevil unarmed and alone, he fled, escaping his foe in the river. When he came to shore, Owl was captured by police, convicted, and sentenced to prison by Judge Lewis.

Following an escape, the Owl established a new hideout on a volcanic isle and kidnapped Judge Lewis and Matt Murdock (Daredevil's alter ego), forcing them to participate in a sham trial with Lewis as the defendant. Murdock managed to change into Daredevil. The Owl's second confrontation with his nemesis ended in a draw, and both were forced to flee the erupting island. He was later freed from prison by Mr. Kline, who ordered him to capture Daredevil. The Owl lured Daredevil into combat and defeated him, sending him plummeting to his death. However, Daredevil was saved by the Black Widow, and the two of them worked together to capture the Owl when his gang broke into the San Francisco treasury. The Owl then moved to Chicago, and acquired the technology to drain human brains of knowledge, and battled the Cat. The Owl returned to San Francisco, and briefly captured Daredevil and the Black Widow. The Owl was later stricken with a debilitating ailment resulting in the paralysis of his legs. He returned to New York, and recruited the Man-Bull. The Owl attempted to kidnap a neurologist to cure his ailment, but was foiled by Daredevil.

The Owl was later rescued by his henchmen, and fitted with a neurological pacemaker to cure his ailment. He battled Daredevil and Spider-Man, and was incapacitated when his pacemaker short-circuited. The Owl was confined to a life-support module designed by the Maggia. He schemed to loot New York under cover of a citywide blackout, but was captured by Spider-Man, the Black Widow, and Simon Stroud. No longer confined to the module, the Owl later engaged in a gang war against Doctor Octopus in an attempt to usurp the Kingpin's position as the crime boss of New York's underworld. The Owl encountered Spider-Man and the Black Cat, and was beaten by Doctor Octopus. The Owl was later mystically summoned to Winnipeg, Canada, by Llan the Sorcerer. There, he battled Alpha Flight and Gamma Flight with Nekra, the Asp, and the Scorpion. The Owl was later among the criminals assembled by Doctor Doom to battle the Fantastic Four in Washington, D.C.

Over the years the Owl has become less and less human as a result of bizarre experiments he has subjected himself to in efforts to improve his natural ability to glide and repair damage to his spine that rendered him a paraplegic. The Owl once needed to use an exoskeleton to walk but has since recovered from this injury.

The Owl started to re-establish his presence in the criminal underworld with the absence of the Kingpin. When Spider-Man visits him regarding information about the kidnaping of May Parker, the Owl says that Electro and the Vulture kidnapped her. This turns out to be a ploy by the Owl, who is after the two villains (hiring the Black Cat to find them) for stealing from him. He began to enlarge his criminal empire by refining Mutant Growth Hormone from his own genetic material, though Daredevil was able to get him arrested.

He managed to manipulate behind the scenes and get the Kingpin arrested for a past murder when it looked like Fisk was going to make a deal with the FBI. The deal in question involved Matt Murdock being arrested for being Daredevil. When Foggy Nelson, representing Murdock in court, visited him in jail, he was apparently killed by the other prisoners. The Owl later taunted Murdock about this, and Murdock, who had become unhinged due to his friend's death, brutally beat the Owl. Unbeknownst to the two of them, Foggy was alive at the time and in witness protection.

Later, the Owl escaped prison and stole Deathlok from S.H.I.E.L.D., killing four agents in the process. He sets up an auction in hopes of selling him off to the highest bidder to other supervillains. However, he did not ask permission of the Hood (the self-established "Kingpin of Supervillains") and the Hood subsequently stole Deathlok from the Owl and shot the Owl.

The Owl has since then appeared in police custody. He was subsequently freed by the Kingpin, who sought to employ him as part of his plan to take revenge on The Hand. He took Dakota North captive and implied he would torture and sexually assault her in order to get information on Daredevil, who then appeared and cut every nerve in both his arms and legs using a sword the Owl had tried to attack him with.

Members of Owl's gang were shown fighting in a gang war with the Maggia at a scrapyard. Hammerhead shot the gang while Silvermane was fed to a metal crusher.

It was later revealed that Owl received his henchmen from Taskmaster who had trained them.

Owl was next seen purchasing a product called Ebony which came from the glands of Corruptor. He planned to synthesize it into a street drug only for Daredevil to arrive and steal it.

Owl attended a circus with Kingpin, Madame Masque, Tombstone, and Hammerhead when Hawkeye stole their money.

Owl's gang later ended up in a gunfight with a gang led by the third White Dragon. Both Owl and White Dragon were brutally beaten up by the Superior Spider-Man (Otto Octavius's mind in Spider-Man's body). The remainder of Owl's gang fled and were recruited by Goblin King to join the Goblin Nation.

The Sinister Six (consisting of Boomerang, Overdrive, Shocker, Speed Demon, and Beetle) assaulted Owl's base. Overdrive and Speed Demon were captured by Owl and interrogated. Beetle tried to blackmail the Owl into releasing them while covertly dialing for back-up. Unimpressed, the Owl got ready to execute her when reinforcements arrived in the form of Tombstone (who was revealed to be Beetle's father).

After a series of failures Boomerang teams up with the Owl and forms the Sinister Sixteen in order to retrieve the picture of Doctor Doom that the former had stolen a few days before, and that was now in the hands of the Chameleon. The line-up consisted of the dregs of the underworld that Boomerang used as cannon fodder so that he could retrieve the painting.

In a prelude to the "Hunted" storyline, Owl is among the animal-themed characters captured by Taskmaster and Black Ant for Kraven the Hunter's upcoming Great Hunt. He later watches the fight between Spider-Man and Scorpion until the Hunter-Bots arrive. He then joins Spider-Man and the other animal-themed characters in fleeing from the Hunter-Bots. Owl and the other animal-themed characters meet with Vulture where Spider-Man informs them about the loss of Gibbon and Mandrill while Toad mentions the loss of Man-Bull. When Kraven the Hunter has Arcade deactivate the forcefield, Owl is among the animal-themed characters that are freed.

Owl is among the crime lords competing with Mister Negative in obtaining the Tablet of Life and Destiny in order to win the favor of Mayor Wilson Fisk.

Powers and abilities

He is able to perform complex midair maneuvers while he glides which would be impossible for ordinary humans. The Owl's gliding ability is assisted by a weak psionic ability to levitate his body. Under the right conditions, such as favorable air currents, the Owl can glide for at least the length of a city block. He uses specially designed capes to allow him to do this.

His bones are hollow, and he possesses a greater proportionate muscle mass than normal humans. Though the Owl only exercises moderately, his strength, endurance, resistance/resiliency to injury and fatigue, and reflexes/reactions are enhanced as a result of his mutation (he is physically stronger and tougher than any Olympic weightlifter). His vision and hearing are superhumanly acute, his head can rotate 180 degrees, and his eyes can move independently of each other in their own sockets and have greater visual range than an ordinary human. His teeth and nails are essentially fangs and talons which can tear through human flesh with relative ease. Most of his adversaries assume that he is just a normal human as he almost never engages in physical struggles; he relegates this to his underlings, like the Vulture and Electro.

Over the years the Owl has taken a number of experimental drugs and subjected himself to experimental surgical procedures to increase his ability to glide. These experiments have met with mixed results and a by-product of them is that he has been mutagenically altered in a way that has negatively affected his sanity and made him more animal like. For instance, he enjoys eating live mice with his vintage six hundred dollar wine. It also paralyzed him down the waist for some time, making him unable to stand or walk without a special leg-brace exoskeleton.

The Owl wears a set of metal razor-sharp steel-tool talons attached to each forearm (closely resembling Wolverine's claws) and a specially designed cape designed to resemble an owl's outstretched wings to assist him in steering during flight, and often uses various other bird-themed weapons and pieces of equipment. This special equipment was designed for him by the Terrible Tinkerer. Although the Owl is somewhat deranged, he is an extremely skilled criminal organizer and money launderer.

Other versions

Age of Apocalypse
In the alternate timeline of the 1995–1996 Age of Apocalypse storyline, the Owl is a member of the Marauders, a terrorist group composed of humans who have betrayed humanity and joined Apocalypse. This incarnation of the Owl is killed by Gwen Stacy and Clint Barton, alongside fellow Marauders members Dirigible, Red and Arcade.

Age of Ultron
During the 2013 Age of Ultron storyline, Owl and Hammerhead captured the Superior Spider-Man and hoped to trade him with Ultron. Hawkeye came to Superior Spider-Man's rescue as the Ultron Sentinels attacked.

Marvel Zombies
In the alternate universe of Marvel Zombies, Owl and Hammerhead (who are lackeys to the Kingpin) are gunned down by the Punisher despite the zombie apocalypse raging right outside.

In other media

Television
 The Owl makes a non-speaking cameo appearance in the Spider-Man episode "The Insidious Six" as a crime lord and associate of Silvermane's.
 Leland Owlsley appears as a series regular in season one of Daredevil, portrayed by Bob Gunton. This version a crooked human accountant for the firm Silver & Brent who manages Wilson Fisk's finances and has a son named Lee Owlsley. After Fisk falls in love with Vanessa Marianna, Owlsley conspires with triad boss Madame Gao to kill her, believing Marianna is a bad influence on Fisk. However, Gao is forced to leave town due to Matt Murdock dismantling her heroin ring. Owlsley attempts to blackmail Fisk into letting him take over Gao's operation, but reveals his failed attempt on Marianna's life, causing an enraged Fisk to throw Owlsley into an elevator shaft to his death.

Video games
The Owl appeared as a mini-boss in Spider-Man.

References

External links
 

Characters created by Joe Orlando
Characters created by Stan Lee
Comics characters introduced in 1964
Fictional businesspeople
Fictional characters with superhuman senses
Fictional crime bosses
Fictional gangsters
Marvel Comics characters with superhuman strength
Marvel Comics male supervillains
Marvel Comics mutates
Marvel Comics supervillains
Marvel Comics television characters